Christian Louis (25 February 1622 – 15 March 1665) was Duke of Brunswick-Lüneburg. A member of the House of Welf, from 1641 until 1648 he ruled the Principality of Calenberg, a subdivision of the duchy, and, from 1648 until his death, the Principality of Lüneburg.

Christian Louis was born in Herzberg am Harz. In 1641, he inherited the Principality of Calenberg from his father, Duke George of Brunswick-Lüneburg, who had suddenly died. Like his father, he resided at the Leineschloss in Hanover.

When in 1648 he also inherited the Principality of Lüneburg from his uncle, Frederick IV, Duke of Brunswick-Lüneburg, both subdivisions were ruled in personal union. However, Christian Louis gave Calenberg to his younger brother George William, and instead ruled the larger territory of Lüneburg at Celle Castle.

In 1642 Christian Louis became a member of the Fruitbearing Society. He married Sophia Dorothea, daughter of Duke Philipp of Schleswig-Holstein-Sonderburg-Glücksburg on October 9, 1653. 

He died childless at Celle in 1665 and was succeeded by his brother George William, who on this occasion gave the Calenberg territory to his younger brother John Frederick. Both territories finally merged after George William's death in 1705 to the Electorate of Hanover under John Frederick's nephew George I Louis, Prince of Calenberg. Christian Louis's widow remarried and became Electress of Brandenburg as the second wife of the Great Elector.

Ancestry

See also
List of the rulers of Lüneburg

References
 Allgemeine Deutsche Biographie, vol. 4, p. 163-164
 At the House of Welf site

1622 births
1665 deaths
People from Herzberg am Harz
People from Grubenhagen
New House of Lüneburg